Homoserine (also called isothreonine) is an α-amino acid with the chemical formula HO2CCH(NH2)CH2CH2OH. -Homoserine is not one of the common amino acids encoded by DNA.  It differs from the proteinogenic amino acid serine by insertion of an additional -CH2- unit into the backbone.  Homoserine, or its lactone form, is the product of a cyanogen bromide cleavage of a peptide by degradation of methionine.

Homoserine is an intermediate in the biosynthesis of three essential amino acids: methionine, threonine (an isomer of homoserine), and isoleucine. Its complete biosynthetic pathway includes glycolysis, the tricarboxylic acid (TCA) or citric acid cycle or the Krebs cycle, and the aspartate metabolic pathway. It forms by two reductions of aspartic acid via the intermediacy of aspartate semialdehyde.I Specifically, the enzyme homoserine dehydrogenase, in association with NADPH, catalyzes a reversible reaction that interconverts L-aspartate-4-semialdehyde to L-homoserine. Then, two other enzymes, homoserine kinase and homoserine o-succinyl transferase use homoserine as a substrate and produce phosphohomoserine and o-succinyl homoserine respectively.

Applications

Commercially, homoserine can serve as precursor to the synthesis of isobutanol and 1,4-butanediol. Purified  homoserine is used in enzyme structural studies.  Also, homoserine has played important roles in studies to elucidate peptide synthesis and synthesis of proteoglycan glycopeptides.  Bacterial cell lines can make copious amounts of this amino acid.

Biosynthesis

Homoserine is produced from aspartate via aspartate-4-semialdehyde, which is produced from β-phosphoaspartate. By the action of homoserine dehydrogenases, the semialdehyde is converted to homoserine.

L-Homoserine is substrate for homoserine kinase, yielding phosphohomoserine (homoserine-phosphate), which is converted to by threonine synthase to yield L-threonine.

Homoserine is converted to o-succinyl homoserine by homoserine o-succinyl transferase, a precursor to L-methionine.

Homoserine allosterically inhibits aspartate kinase and glutamate dehydrogenase. Glutamate dehydrogenase  reversibly converts glutamate to α-ketoglutarate and α-ketoglutarate coverts to oxaloacetate through the citric cycle. Threonine acts as another allosteric inhibitor of aspartate kinase and homoserine dehydrogenase, but it is a competitive inhibitor of homoserine kinase.

References 

Amino acids
Non-proteinogenic amino acids